Boo Johnson (born Jakel Johnson, February 1, 1993) is an American goofy-footed skateboarder and skate company owner, recognized for his style and positive attitude.

Professional skateboarding career 
Johnson turned pro at the age of 23, in 2016.

Pharmacy board shop 
Johnson owns Pharmacy Long Beach, a skate shop in Long Beach, CA.

JHF - Just Have Fun clothing 
Johnson owns his own clothing company, Just Have Fun, founded in 2016.

Inspiration 
Johnson takes inspiration from people who inspire others, namely: Bob Marley, David Goggins, Alan Watts, Will Smith, and others.

References

External links
SKATE/explain: Boo Johnson? What Kind of Name Is Boo? - Transworld

1993 births
American skateboarders
Living people
African-American skateboarders
People from Kern County, California
21st-century African-American sportspeople